Sade's is a one-and-one-half-story, commercial building in downtown Carmel-by-the-Sea, California. It was built in 1925, for novelist and dramatist Harry Leon Wilson and his wife as a flower shop and dress shop. In the 1930s, Sade (Sade Carr-Latham) was a former Ziegfeld Follies dancer, made the lower level into a restaurant and bar that was nationally renowned. The building was designated as a significant commercial building in the city's Downtown Historic District Property Survey, and was recorded with the Department of Parks and Recreation on January 28, 2002. The first floor of the building is now occupied by the Porta Bella Mediterranean restaurant and bar. The second floor is occupied by Kids by the Sea.

History

Sade's is a two-story, wood-framed Tudor Revival style commercial building in Carmel-by-the-Sea, California, built for Harry Leon Wilson (1867-1939). The exterior walls are textured cement stucco. It has two steep pitched side-gabled roofs, and two chimneys. There is a Carmel stone entry to the building in the Court of the Golden Bough, with other small “old world” shops. The entry has a round wood planked door with a window and an outside staircase that leads to the second floor. Behind the courtyard was the entrance to the Theatre of the Golden Bough. Because of this, the courtyard has been named the Courtyard of the Golden Bough. 

The shops in the courtyard include Sade's (now Porta Bella’s with patio dining), Seven Arts Shop (now Body Frenzy) and the Carmel Weavers Studio (now Cottage of Sweets).

Sade's was built in May 1925, two years after Edward G. Kuster and Gottfried completed the first European shop, the Carmel Weavers Studio, in an area of the Court of the Golden Bough, at Monte Verde and Ocean Avenue. Writer and editor Harry Leon Wilson commission Lee Gottfried to build the "Bloomin Basement," a flower shop, for his wife, Helen Wilson. The shop was built for $8,000 (.

In the 1930s, Sade Carr-Latham herself, a former Ziegfeld Follies dancer, made the lower level into a restaurant and bar. Sade's became a popular meeting place for the many Bohemian actors, artists, and writers associated with Kuster's Golden Bough Theater, including George Sterling, Mary Austin, and Jack London. 

For fifty years Sade's was one of the most popular social spots in the village and became nationally renowned. Sade died of a heart attack at her home in Carmel Woods on November 11, 1940.

On December 28, 1951, Paul Swanson became the owner of Sade's. He was manager of the restaurant since 1934. Swanson purchased the restaurant and cocktail lounge from Margaret and Bertram Dienelt, owner of the Mission Ranch since early 1941. Joel Thomas changed the name to El Matador. The building changed hands many times, with the name changing back to Sade's, until its last opening day on February 26, 1994.

The building qualifies for inclusion in the Downtown Historic District Property Survey because it contributes to the overall design of the historic Court of the Golden Bough, and it is a good example of Tudor Revival design by Carmel builder Lee E. Gottfried.

Lee Gottfried

La Von "Lee" E. Gottfried (1896-1968), was a native of Hicksville, Ohio. He came west working for the Pacific Telephone Company. In 1917, he enlisted in the U. S. Army and served in France during World War I. When he returned to California he came to Carmel in 1919 and worked in the contracting business. He married Bonnie Adele Hale (1900-1967) on November 4, 1919 in Carmel, who was the step-daughter of writer Frederick R. Bechdolt.

Gottfried worked for Edward G. Kuster when he designed and built his stone house on Carmel Point. He designed and built his own home in 1921. He continued to work for Kuster, building the Carmel Weavers Studio for Ruth Kuster in 1922 and Sadie's in 1925. He also was the contractor and builder for two houses in Carmel Woods near Serra Circle. 

He was an early member of the Abalone League along Fred Godwin, Charley Van Riper, Eddie Burns, Harrison Godwin, and Byington Ford.

Gottfried died on January 15, 1968, at age 72, in Monterey, California. Funeral services were held at the Little Chapel-by-the-Sea.

See also
 Monterey Peninsula

References

External links

 Downtown Conservation District Historic Property Survey
 Office of Historic Preservation

1925 establishments in California
Carmel-by-the-Sea, California
Buildings and structures in Monterey County, California